Aaranyak is a leading wildlife NGO based in Guwahati. It was founded by Bibhab Kumar Talukdar. It is a Scientific, Industrial Research and frontline environmental organization of India. It works all over the eastern Himalayan region on nature conservation, natural resources management, climate change, disaster management and livelihood enhancement of marginalized communities through research, education and advocacy.

The group says its mission is to foster conservation of biodiversity in Northeast India through research, environmental education, capacity building and advocacy for legal and policy reform to usher a new era of ecological security.
Recently, UN framework convention on climate change announced Aaranyak in partnership with the International Centre for Integrated Mountain Development (ICIMOD) as winner of its UN Lighthouse Activity Award 2014 for the successful implementation of the community-based flood early warning system in the Lakhimpur and Dhemaji Districts of Assam.

History

In September 2022,Aaranyak,a leading wildlife NGO in Northeast India, completed 33 years of its existence. Aaranyak which made a beginning as nature's club in a small way has transformed into a premiere scientific research and conservation organization of the country. The work of organisation spans across various fields like wildlife & biodiversity conservation, on mitigation of disaster and climate risk, water governance, conservation education, legal and advocacy. The organisation has contributed a lot on livelihood interventions for the marginalized communities, natural resources management, through research, education and advocacy in the last 30 years. Its staff includes conservationists, ecologists and professionals from diverse disciplines totaling approximately 120 members who had been working together to foster the conservation of biodiversity. Aaranyak has to its credit many research articles, reports, books, brochures and other educational materials written and published by a network of hundreds of members and volunteers. Additionally the Organisation has also introduced some of the new initiatives which are worth mentioning like series of webinars and live discussion programmes titled, “Eco Talk”, “Science, Environment & Mankind: Fundamentals” and “Conservation Matters” etc.  In year February 2020, a major event was organized by Aaranyak in collaboration with several other organizations and institutions titled “7th Asian Primate Symposium & First International Conference on Human-Primate Interface, 2020”.

The organisation had responded efficiently to the crisis unleashed by the outbreak of the COVID-19 through proactive voluntarism and raised awareness and assisted the efforts of the Central and the State Government to prevent and deal with the pandemic and also proactively regulated its organisational activities in accordance with the instructions and guidelines of GOI and GOA. It had provided aid and encouraged the local communities to develop cloth facemasks and distributed the same to the staff and related members and  donated a sum of Rs 1,00,000 to Assam Government to help strengthen the government initiatives to check spread of pandemic.

The event to mark the 31st formation day commenced with Aaranyak flag hoisting, followed by a keynote speech by the President and the Secretary General of Aaranyak and members of the foundation observed the day with a brief programme, which was streamed live on Aaranyak’s official Facebook page, due to the present COVID-19 pandemic.

Activities in Kaziranga
A joint study carried out by Aaranyak and the Assam Forest Department, has shown that Kaziranga National Park has the highest density of wild tigers in the world. The report is the result of a study carried out during January–March 2009. Recently, the premier biodiversity conservation organisation had installed 18 km of solar-powered fence to facilitate human-elephant coexistence at Nagrijuli in Baksa district. The initiative will ensure food security and commendable reduction in incidents relating to humans and elephants and will also benefit approx 12 villages with 35 hamlets and 15000 villagers. The solar powered fence was installed after conducting extensive support from local communities and forest department and funded by Elephant Family Foundation India and covers 18 kilometers with two strands installed in two phases covering several villages around the Nagrijuli-Udalguri National Highway.

List of notable programs and campaigns

Aaranyak sponsors vehicles to Manas National Park.

Awards, recognitions and collaborations

Aaranyak had been awarded with many regional, national and international awards and accolades from many countries for its outstanding work and contribution to the society from many years.

Indira Gandhi Paryavaran Award from MoEFCC, Govt. of India in  year 2012

“Best Scientific Institution in Assam” under the category of “State Awards for Scientific Excellence, 2017” by the Science & Technology Department, Government of Assam in year 2017.

organizational member of the International Union for Conservation of Nature (IUCN).

Recognised as a Scientific and Industrial Research Organisation (SIRO) by Department of Scientific and Industrial Research, Ministry of Science and Technology

Books from Aaranyak

References

External links
www.aaranyak.org-Official website
Aaranyak Aaranyak at Bizvine
Aaranyak is looking for a research assistant
Aaranyak's activities in Kaziranga

Organizations established in 1989
Animal charities based in India
Environmental organisations based in India
Charities based in India
Sustainability organizations
Organisations based in Assam
Animal welfare organisations based in India
1989 establishments in Assam